The State Street Bridge is a historic structure located in Mason City, Iowa, United States. In the mid- to late-19th century, State Street was the only road into town from the east. There was a bridge at this crossing from at least 1875, but it is unknown what kind of bridges or how many served the crossing. This bridge was completed in 1903 and features a barrel arch with filled spandrels. Although the original guardrails have been replaced, it is the oldest roadway arch bridge in Cerro Gordo County. It was listed on the National Register of Historic Places in 1998.

See also
 
 
 
 
 List of bridges on the National Register of Historic Places in Iowa
 National Register of Historic Places listings in Cerro Gordo County, Iowa

References

Bridges completed in 1903
Arch bridges in Iowa
Bridges in Cerro Gordo County, Iowa
National Register of Historic Places in Mason City, Iowa
Road bridges on the National Register of Historic Places in Iowa
Buildings and structures in Mason City, Iowa